The Overlook is the 18th novel by American crime writer Michael Connelly, and the thirteenth featuring the Los Angeles detective Hieronymus "Harry" Bosch.

The novel first appeared in serialised form in The New York Times Magazine, in sixteen installments published from September 17, 2006 to January 21, 2007.

The tile of the book is in reference to the scene of the crime in the opening chapter. The location described in the novel is based on an actual overlook above the Hollywood Reservoir and Mulholland Dam, located on the 3100 block of Canyon Lake Drive in the Hollywood Hills neighborhood of Los Angeles.

Plot summary
Evidence mounts that the murder of Stanley Kent is part of a terrorist plot to build and deploy a dirty bomb, justifying the FBI's moves to push the Los Angeles Police Department (LAPD) and Bosch to the sidelines. Refusing to be sidelined, Bosch aggressively works around the FBI in order to track down Kent's killers, much to the chagrin of his young, inexperienced partner, who sees his career at the LAPD jeopardized by Bosch's actions. The FBI agents, including Rachel Walling, view Bosch as endangering their attempts to retrieve the missing cesium and to track down known terrorists. Relying on instinct and experience, Bosch pursues his line of inquiry, ultimately succeeding in solving the murder and recovering the cesium.

Characters
Harry Bosch, the lead detective on the case, who is the principal protagonist of this and twelve previous Harry Bosch novels.
Rachel Walling, who was romantically involved with Harry in a number of previous Harry Bosch novels. In this story, while Harry has hopes of re-connecting with Rachel, their relationship is strained, owing to conflicting views on how the investigation should be carried out.
Ignacio "Iggy" Ferras, Bosch's young partner. Iggy wants to play by the book and is seriously disturbed by Bosch's let's-break-the-rules attitude. At one point, he tells Bosch that he can't work with him and will be requesting a new partner.
Stanley Kent, the murder victim who has stolen 32 sources of cesium from a Los Angeles hospital in response to demands from unknown parties who have taken his wife hostage. If used in a dirty bomb, tens of thousands of people could die from radiation exposure.
Alicia Kent, the beautiful wife of the murder victim, who was taken hostage in her home by two intruders. She was used by the intruders to pressure Stanley Kent to steal the cesium from the hospital.
Jack Brenner, Rachel Walling's FBI partner and superior and the lead FBI agent on the case. His primary concern is dealing with the terror threat associated with the stolen cesium. To him, Bosch's homicide investigation is a secondary concern.
Cliff Maxwell, an FBI agent working on the case, with whom Bosch has two violent encounters.

References

2007 American novels
Harry Bosch series
Novels first published in serial form
Works originally published in The New York Times Magazine
Novels set in Los Angeles
Little, Brown and Company books